Kostelec is a municipality and village in Jihlava District in the Vysočina Region of the Czech Republic. It has about 900 inhabitants.

Economy
Since 1917, the meat packing factory Kostelecké uzeniny has been operating in the municipality. It is the biggest producer of sausages, cured and smoked meat products in the country.

References

Villages in Jihlava District